Jerzy Feliks Bielecki (born 19 November 1969 in Janów Lubelski) is a Polish politician. He was elected to the Sejm on 25 September 2005, getting 4,748 votes in 6 Lublin district as a candidate from the Law and Justice list.

See also
Members of Polish Sejm 2005-2007

External links
Jerzy Bielecki - parliamentary page - includes declarations of interest, voting record, and transcripts of speeches.

1969 births
Living people
People from Janów Lubelski County
Members of the Polish Sejm 2005–2007
Members of the Polish Sejm 2015–2019
Members of the Polish Sejm 2019–2023
Law and Justice politicians